Marlow is a surname of English origin, derived from the town of Marlow in Buckinghamshire.

People with the surname
 Alex Marlow (born 1986), editor of Breitbart News
Bobby Marlow (c. 1930–1985), American football running back
Charles Marlow (jockey) (1814–1882), English jockey
Donny Marlow, ring name of Tanga Loa, wrestler
Ellen Marlow (born 1994), American actress
Francis Marlow (1867–1952), English cricketer
Frank Marlow (1869–1935), Australian rules football administrator
Fred Marlow (1928–2013), English (soccer) footballer
Geoff Marlow (1914–1978), English (soccer) footballer
George Marlow born Joseph Marks (1876–1939) Australian theatre entrepreneur
Ian Marlow (born 1963), English rugby union and rugby league footballer
Janet Marlow (born 1958), British middle-distance runner
Jess Marlow (1929–2014), American journalist
Jesse Marlow (born 1978), Australian photographer
John Marlow (1829–1903), police officer in Queensland, Australia
Joseph Marlow (1854–1923), English cricketer
Ken Marlow (born 1960), American realist painter
Lucy Drake Marlow (née Drake 1890–1978), American artist
Max Marlow (disambiguation)
Max Marlow, pseudonym of British writing team Christopher Nicole and Diana Bachmann
Max Marlow (filmmaker) (born 1995), British filmmaker, writer and producer
Max Marlow (musician), British musician
Michael Marlow (died 1828), Anglican priest and Oxford University administrator
Michael Marlow (economist), professor at California Polytechnic
Mitch Marlow, sometime guitarist with He Is Legend
Peter Marlow (disambiguation)
Peter Marlow (athlete) (born 1941), British racewalker
Peter Marlow (photographer) (1952–2016), British news photographer
Ric Marlow (born Sanford Phillip Schafler 1925–2017), American songwriter and actor
Richard Marlow (1939–2013), English choral conductor and organist
Robert Marlow (born 1961), UK musician also performing as "Marlow"
Simon Marlow, British computer programmer
Thomas Marlow (1878–1954), English cricketer
Tim Marlow (born 1962), British writer, broadcaster and art historian 
Toby Marlow (born 1994), English writer, composer and actor
Tony Marlow (born 1940), British Conservative MP
William Marlow (1740–1813), English landscape and marine painter and etcher
William Marlow (cricketer) (1900–1975), played for Leicestershire

Fictional characters
Marlow series of books by Antonia Forest
Charles Marlow, a character created by Joseph Conrad
Philip Marlow, protagonist of The Singing Detective TV miniseries

See also 
 Marlow (disambiguation)
 Marlowe (name)

English toponymic surnames